The George Washington Carver Homestead Site, near Beeler, Kansas, is a  area which was listed on the National Register of Historic Places in 1977.

On this property George Washington Carver built a sod house, broke ground, and planted crops and trees.  Carver was one of few black homesteaders in Ness County, Kansas, but had skill in building sod buildings and was helpful to others.

References

Sod houses
National Register of Historic Places in Ness County, Kansas
Houses completed in 1886
Homestead Site
African-American history of Kansas
1886 establishments in Kansas